Nawab Sir Muhammad Akram Khan     was the ruler of the Indian princely state of Amb from 1877 until his death in 1907.  Son of Jehandad Khan, he was only nine years old when his father died. People of that time thought that Maddad Khan Tanoli, the ruling Khan of Phulra, might assert a claim as ruler but no such event occurred at that time.

He built the fort at Shergarh, as well as those at Dogah and Shahkot. His rule was a peaceful time for Tanawal, with no major conflicts. As well as being appointed a knight commander of the Order of the Star of India, he also received from the British Crown the title of Nawab Bahadur and this title was eventually granted to his descendants in perpetuity. 
The Imperial Gazetteer of India reported that in 1901 Amb had an area of 214 square miles and a population of 31,622. 

When he died his son khan Zaman khan succeeded him. He should not be confused with Muhammad Akram Khan (1817–1852), one of the sons of Dost Mohammad Khan, Emir of Afghanistan.

Notes

1907 deaths
Nawabs of Amb
1868 births
Knights Commander of the Order of the Star of India
Princely rulers of Pakistan
Nawabs of Pakistan